Robert Francis Joyce (October 7, 1896—September 2, 1990) was an American prelate of the Roman Catholic Church. He served as bishop of the Diocese of Burlington in Vermont from 1956 to 1971.

Biography
Robert Joyce was born on October 7, 1896, in Proctor, Vermont, to Patrick Joseph and Ellen (née Connor) Joyce. After graduating from Proctor High School, he studied at the University of Vermont in Burlington and the Grand Seminary of Montreal in Montreal, Quebec.

Joyce was ordained to the priesthood for the Diocese of Burlington by Bishop Joseph John Rice on 26 May 1923. Joyce then did pastoral work in the diocese until 1927, when he became principal of the Cathedral High School in South Burlington, Vermont. He resumed his pastoral ministry in 1932.  Joyce enlisted in the US Army Chaplain Corps in 1943, serving there until 1946. He later served as a pro-synodal judge and diocesan director of the Holy Name Society.

Auxiliary Bishop and Bishop of Burlington 
On July 8 1954, Joyce was appointed auxiliary bishop of the Diocese of Burlington and Titular Bishop of Citium by Pope Pius XII. He received his episcopal consecration on October 28, 1954, from Bishop Edward Ryan, with Bishops Matthew Brady and Bernard Flanagan serving as co-consecrators. 

After the death of Bishop Ryan, Pius XII named Joyce as the sixth bishop of Burlington on December 29, 1956. He was installed on  February 26, 1957. Joyce attended the Second Vatican Council in Rome from 1962 to 1965, and served on the National Board of the American Cancer Society for 10 years.

On December 14, 1971, Pope Paul VI accepted Joyce's resignation as bishop of Burlington. Robert Joyce died in Burlington on September 2, 1990, at age 93.  He was buried at Resurrection Park in South Burlington, Vermont.

References

1896 births
1990 deaths
Roman Catholic bishops of Burlington
Participants in the Second Vatican Council
People from Proctor, Vermont
20th-century Roman Catholic bishops in the United States
University of Vermont alumni
World War II chaplains
United States Army chaplains
American expatriates in Canada
American school principals